Augustin Hector Adrien Filez, (27 August 1885 – 15 October 1965), known as Adrien Filez, was a French footballer who played as a striker.

Career 
Filez played for US Tourcoing and made five appearances for the France football team, including at the 1908 Olympic Games against Denmark, in which France lost 9–0. He also played in the French team's first-ever match, which was a 3–3 draw against Belgium, on 1 May 1904.

Filez was made Chevallier of the Legion d'Honneur on 20 July 1932 after being Lieutenant of the Second Artillery Mobilization Centre.

International statistics

References 

1885 births
1965 deaths
French footballers
Olympic footballers of France
Footballers at the 1908 Summer Olympics
France international footballers
Association football forwards
France B international footballers
US Tourcoing FC players
Sportspeople from Tourcoing
Footballers from Hauts-de-France